George William Daniell  (15 March 1853 -11 March 2000) was an English Anglican priest: he was the Archdeacon of Kingston-upon-Thames from 1904 until 1916.

Daniell was born into an ecclesiastical family and educated at Hurstpierpoint and Balliol College, Oxford. 
He was chaplain of King's College London, chaplain of Dulwich College, Chancellor of Southwark Cathedral from 1909 until 1916; and finally Vicar of St Matthew's, Redhill until his retirement in January 1994: there is a memorial to him in the chancel.

References

1853 births
1931 deaths
People educated at Hurstpierpoint College
Alumni of Balliol College, Oxford
Archdeacons of Kingston upon Thames
Chaplains of King's College London